Arbutus Ridge is an affluent residential neighbourhood in Vancouver's West Side. It is bordered by 16th Avenue in the north, 41st Avenue in the south, Mackenzie Street in the west, and East Boulevard in the east. The neighbourhood is characterized by larger than average lot sizes, with stately homes on tree-lined streets.

One of the catalysts for growth in the neighbourhood was the existence of the Vancouver-Steveston Interurban route of the British Columbia Electric Railway, which ran between 1905 and 1958. The route once followed by the interurban is now part of the Arbutus Greenway.

History
In 1888, the Province granted 2,100 hectares (5,289 acres) of land to the Canadian Pacific Railway, including a large portion of what is now Arbutus Ridge. The land consisted of uplands that surrounded a low-lying marsh area called Asthma Flats. The upland areas were developed first, between 1912 and the 1930s. In the 1940s and 1950s, the marsh was filled in with sand brought in from False Creek to allow the development of houses and shops.

Demographics

Education 

Prince of Wales Secondary School is located in the neighbourhood, along with Carnarvon Elementary School and Trafalgar Elementary School, which offers a French immersion program.

Businesses 
Arbutus Ridge is a predominantly residential area with small businesses clustering along Arbutus, between Broadway and W. 16th Avenue.

Houses 
Most of the lot sizes are large (50-foot frontage by 120-foot depth), with stately homes on tree-lined streets.  In the spring, the area becomes a mecca for cherry blossom enthusiasts, with its many blocks full of blossoms.

Heritage 
The Curry Residence at the intersection of Arbutus Street and West Eighteen Avenue is a one-storey and basement single-family residence.  The house is a relatively rare example of Mission Style domestic architecture in Vancouver.

Accommodation 
There are no hotels, however, there are a few bed and breakfast in the area, including Vancouver Traveller Bed and Breakfast on West 21st Avenue, between Arbutus Street and Yew Street.

Notes

References

External links 
City of Vancouver – Arbutus Ridge
Vancouver Heritage Foundation.org /house-styles/

Neighbourhoods in Vancouver